Lilli Promet (16 February 1922 – 16 February 2007) was an Estonian author.

Life
Promet was born in Petseri to the Estonian painter, Aleksander Promet. After finishing Tallinn 18th Elementary School, she entered the State Industrial Art School in 1935, from which she graduated in Spring 1940. In Autumn she was asked to work at the newspaper Noorte Hääl. After the outbreak of World War II, she and her family were forced to leave their home and evacuated to Tatarstan. In Summer 1943, Promet went to work at Estonian language radio in blocked Leningrad. 1944–1951 she worked as a journalist in Tallinn.

Promet died on her 85th birthday in Tallinn. She is buried at the Metsakalmistu cemetery in Tallinn.

She was married to writer Ralf Parve (1919–2011). Their son Ralf R. Parve (1946–2008) was a journalist and politician.

Filmography
Roosa kübar (1963)
Tütarlaps mustas (1966)
Pimedad aknad (1968)

Books
The following is a partial list of works published by Lilli Promet
Roosa kübar (1961)
Meesteta küla (1962, novel)
Lamav tiiger (1964)
Kes levitab anekdoote? (1967)
Iibelpuu (1970)
Primavera (1971, novel) 
Raamita pildid (1976, essays)A Summer's Painting and Other Stories (1984)Õhtusel alleel (1989)Iisabel: Romaan (1992)Aheldatud muusa'' (1997)

References

1922 births
2007 deaths
People from Pechory
20th-century Estonian women writers
21st-century Estonian women writers
Burials at Metsakalmistu
Soviet writers